The second season of True Detective, an American anthology crime drama television series created by Nic Pizzolatto, began airing on June 21, 2015, on the premium cable network HBO. With a principal cast of Colin Farrell, Rachel McAdams, Taylor Kitsch, Kelly Reilly, and Vince Vaughn, the season comprises eight episodes and concluded its initial airing on August 9, 2015.

The season's story takes place in California and follows the interweaving stories of officers from three cooperating police departments; when California Highway Patrol officer and war veteran Paul Woodrugh (Kitsch) discovers the body of corrupt city manager Ben Caspere on the side of a highway, Vinci Police Department detective Raymond "Ray" Velcoro (Farrell) and Ventura County Sheriff's Office Criminal Investigation Division Sergeant Antigone "Ani" Bezzerides (McAdams) are called to assist in the following investigation. Career criminal Francis "Frank" Semyon (Vaughn) attempts to legitimize his business with his wife Jordan (Reilly) by investing in a rail project overseen by Caspere, but loses his money when Caspere is killed, prompting him to start his own investigation.

Cast

Main cast 
 Colin Farrell as Detective Raymond "Ray" Velcoro, a corrupt detective from the Vinci Police Department
 Rachel McAdams as Detective Sergeant Antigone "Ani" Bezzerides, a Ventura County Sheriff's Office CID agent
 Taylor Kitsch as Officer Paul Woodrugh, a California Highway Patrol officer, veteran, and former employee of a private security firm
 Kelly Reilly as Jordan Semyon, Semyon's wife
 Vince Vaughn as Francis "Frank" Semyon, a career criminal and entrepreneur who struggles financially after his partner's death

Recurring cast 

 Ritchie Coster as Austin Chessani, Vinci's corrupt mayor
 Christopher James Baker as Blake Churchman, one of Semyon's men
 Afemo Omilami as Josh Holloway, the Vinci chief of police
 Michael Irby as Detective Elvis Ilinca, Bezzerides' partner
 Leven Rambin as Athena Bezzerides, Bezzerides' prostitute sister
 Abigail Spencer as Gena Brune, Velcoro's ex-wife
 Lolita Davidovich as Cynthia Woodrugh, Woodrugh's mother
 James Frain as Kevin Burris, a lieutenant under Holloway
 Riley Smith as Steve Mercer, a California police officer
 Adria Arjona as Emily, Woodrugh's girlfriend
 Michael Hyatt as Katherine Davis, a non-corrupt state attorney
 Yara Martinez as Felicia, a bar owner and friend of Semyon
 Christian Campbell as Richard Brune, Gena's husband
 Jon Lindstrom as Jacob McCandless, a powerful businessman
 Emily Rios as Betty Chessani, Chessani's daughter
 Vinicius Machado as Tony Chessani, Chessani's delinquent son
 Ronnie Gene Blevins as Stan, Semyon's loyal man
 Timothy V. Murphy as Osip Agranov, a Russian businessman and rival to Semyon
 C. S. Lee as Richard Geldof, the Attorney General of California
 Chris Kerson as Nails, Semyon's loyal man
 Rick Springfield as Dr. Irving Pitlor, a plastic surgeon and Caspere's psychiatrist
 Ashley Hinshaw as Lacey Lindel, an actress who runs afoul of Woodrugh
 W. Earl Brown as Detective Teague Dixon, a detective assigned to work on Caspere's murder
 David Morse as Eliot Bezzerides, Bezzerides' father
 Gabriel Luna as Miguel Gilb, Woodrugh's former coworker
 Fred Ward as Eddie Velcoro, Velcoro's father

Episodes

Production 

In January 2014, Pizzolatto signed a two-year contract extension with HBO, effectively renewing the series for two additional seasons. Much like its predecessor, season two of True Detective consists of eight episodes, all written by Pizzolatto. However, the responsibility of directing was assigned to several people; Justin Lin directed the first two episodes, and, in July 2014, William Friedkin was being considered as a director of later episodes. Fukunaga, who directed all of season one, did not return as director; he remains, however, an executive producer, as do McConaughey and Harrelson. Pizzolatto hired fellow novelist Scott Lasser to help break stories for the second half of the season.

Ahead of True Detectives second season, the press publicized rumors that creative differences had fueled personal hostility between Pizzolatto and Fukunaga; the former denied the rumors, while the latter declined to comment. Pizzolatto retained control of the writing process but Fukunaga left, and the second season's eight episodes were instead variously handled among six directors.

Casting 

The success of True Detective, and its subsequent renewal, fueled casting rumors in the press. At one point, early media reports named Cate Blanchett, Josh Brolin, Joaquin Phoenix, Garrett Hedlund, Michael Fassbender, Jessica Chastain, Christian Bale, Elisabeth Moss and Brad Pitt to be among a raft of potential candidates for the leads. The season's first significant casting was Colin Farrell as Ray Velcoro, which he revealed in his September 2014 interview with the Sunday World. Vince Vaughn, playing the role of Frank Semyon, became HBO's next important signing toward the end of the month. By November, True Detective principal cast expanded to include Rachel McAdams, Taylor Kitsch, and Kelly Reilly.

Filming 
California was selected as the setting for the second season. Producers were urged to avoid filming in Los Angeles and, instead, focus on the other regions of the state to "capture a certain psycho-sphere ambiance". Production began in November 2014.

Music 
T Bone Burnett returned as composer for the second season, and the score for the season is more electronic-influenced than the previous season. Burnett noted that the change in landscape, to California, also changed how he wrote the music. Leonard Cohen's "Nevermind," the season two opening theme, is a song off Cohen's 2014 album, Popular Problems. The theme song's lyrics change with every episode, incorporating different verses from Cohen's song. Lera Lynn's music is featured throughout the season, and the song "The Only Thing Worth Fighting For", which she composed with Burnett and Rosanne Cash, is used in the season two trailer. Lynn collaborated with Burnett on writing several original songs for the series, with cues from creator Nic Pizzolatto regarding lyrics and content. Lynn also portrays a bar singer in the season, where several of her songs are used, including "My Least Favorite Life", which was written by Cash.

Reception

Critical response 

The second season received mixed reviews. Positive reviews praised the performances of Farrell, McAdams and Kitsch, its cinematography, and action sequences. The season was named one of the worst television programs of 2015, from many major news outlets such as Variety, The New York Post, Newsday, and TV Guide.

According to Lindsay Hallam at Senses of Cinema, "many reports on the less well-received second season" asserted that Pizzolatto had "become self-indulgent" due to "the lack of a strong collaborator". Critics of season two—including Timberg and Time magazine's James Poniewozik—faulted an excessive delegation of creative control to Pizzolatto alone, arguing that his responsibility for season one's success had been overestimated under the "auteurist" framework. 

On Rotten Tomatoes, the season has a rating of 62%, based on 325 reviews, with an average rating of 6.75/10. The site's critical consensus reads, "True Detectives second season stands on its own as a solid police drama, with memorable moments and resonant relationships outweighing predictable plot twists." On Metacritic, the season has a score of 61 out of 100, based on 41 critics, indicating "generally favorable reviews".

David Hinckley of the New York Daily News gave it a very positive review, and wrote "It's still the kind of show that makes TV viewers reach for phrases like 'golden age of television drama'" and that "the second installment of True Detective goes out of the way not to echo the first." Hank Stuever of The Washington Post gave it a generally positive review, praising the performances, and wrote, "There is something still lugubrious and overwrought about True Detective, but there's also a mesmerizing style to it — it's imperfect, but well made."

A more mixed review came from Brian Lowry of Variety, who wrote "Although generally watchable, the inspiration that turned the first [season] into an obsession for many seems to have drained out of writer Nic Pizzolatto's prose."

Accolades 
For the 6th Critics' Choice Television Awards, Rachel McAdams received a nomination for Best Actress in a Movie Made for Television or Limited Series.

Home media
The second season of True Detective was released on Blu-ray and DVD on January 5, 2016. In addition to the eight episodes, both formats contain bonus content including a making-of featurette of "The Vinci Massacre", interviews with cast and crew, audio commentary for "Down Will Come" by Nic Pizzolatto, Colin Farrell, Vince Vaughn, Taylor Kitsch and Rachel McAdams, and an audio commentary for "Omega Station" by Nic Pizzolatto, Scott Stephens, Colin Farrell and Vince Vaughn.

References

External links 

 
 

2015 American television seasons
True Detective